Jørgen Craig Lello (born 1978 in Fredrikstad, Norway) and Tobias Arnell (born 1978 in Lund, Sweden) are a collaborative duo of contemporary artists working under the name LELLO//ARNELL. Having met at the National Academy of Fine Arts, they started collaborating in 2003. They live and work in Oslo, Norway.

According to their artist statement, they utilize logically broken lines of thought, false statements and fictional scenarios in their examination of how the world is interpreted and understood.

They have participated in exhibitions such as the Norwegian Sculpture Biennal  (2006) at the Vigeland Museum, Lights On: norsk samtidskunst  at the Astrup Fearnley Museum of Modern Art and the Biennale of Graphic Art  at the International Center of Graphic Arts in Ljubljana, Slovenia.

Representation 

In 2009 they entered into a collaboration with Galleri Erik Steen in Oslo. They have had two solo exhibitions at Galleri Erik Steen: Rediscovery  in 2008 and The Charlatan Mind  in 2011.

Notes

External links 
 LELLO//ARNELL's website
 LELLO//ARNELL at Galleri Erik Steen, Oslo

Norwegian contemporary artists
Swedish contemporary artists